Oleksandr Aleksiyenko is a retired Ukrainian footballer who played as a defender.

Career
Oleksandr Aleksiyenko was a product of Desna Chernihiv in 1999. Then he moved to the main team and he managed to play 7 matches in the season 1999–2000 in Ukrainian Second League. In 2001 he moved to Energiya Chernihiv where he stayed until 2004 where he managed to play 26 matches and scored 3 goals. In 2005 he moved to Enerhiya Yuzhnoukrainsk in Ukrainian Second League where he managed 28 matches and he managed to get 12 place in the season 2005–06. In 2008 he moved to Sevastopol where he managed to play 79 matches and scored 13 goals where he stayed until 2011. He also won the Ukrainian First League in the season 2009–10. In 2011 he moved to Buran-Resource Donetsk where he played 8 matches and scored 2 goals. In summer 2012 he moved to Gvardeyets Gvardeyskoye where he played 12 matches and then he moved back to Buran-Resource Donetsk where he played 16 matches and scored 1 goal.

Honours
Sevastopol
 Ukrainian First League: 2009–10

References

External links 
 Oleksandr Aleksiyenko at footballfacts.ru

1981 births
Living people
Footballers from Chernihiv
FC Desna Chernihiv players
FC Enerhiya Yuzhnoukrainsk players
FC Sevastopol players
Ukrainian footballers
Ukrainian Second League players
Ukrainian Amateur Football Championship players
Association football defenders